Puzzle Bobble 2 is a tile-matching video game by Taito. The first sequel to Puzzle Bobble, it is also known in Europe and North America as Bust-A-Move Again for arcades and Bust-A-Move 2 Arcade Edition for home consoles. Released into the arcades in 1995, home conversions followed for the PlayStation, Sega Saturn, Nintendo 64 and Windows platforms. The game was included in Taito Legends 2, but the US arcade version was included on the US PS2 version instead. Further ports for the Nintendo Switch, PlayStation 4 and Xbox One, is scheduled for a February 2023 release by City Connection alongside Puzzle Bobble 3.

The game builds on the original by adding a tournament style variation on the two player game for play against the computer and by adding a branching map to the one player game, allowing the player to periodically select one of two groups of five levels to play next, leading to different game endings. Some of the contestants in the new tournament mode are based on characters from Bubble Bobble, including variations on a Monsta and a Mighta.

Some versions of the game, including the PlayStation, feature time trial competitions in which a single player attempts to finish simple rounds quickly enough to beat previous time records or two players simultaneously attempt to beat the records and each other.

Completion of the single player game gives the player a code which can be entered to unlock 'Another World' for the single player game, which features subtle changes to the existing levels to increase their difficulty and changes to all backdrops to resemble levels from Bubble Bobble. The various enemies from Bubble Bobble also make an appearance in the background of the credits sequence.

North American version

The North American version of the original arcade release is much different than the other versions. One of the most major changes in this version is that Bub and Bob were removed from the game and replaced with a pair of disembodied hands. Also, the characters that were in the Vs. CPU mode were removed and replaced with a generic computer. The backgrounds from the original version were also removed and replaced with 15 new backgrounds, but this also means that the backgrounds get looped in the Puzzle mode, which is 30 stages long. The audio was also changed, and the voices in the game were removed, even though they were in English anyway. These changes were only made for the Taito F3 System version, since the Neo Geo and console releases are based on the original Japanese version. If this version was played in an emulator, it would have the Japanese audio, although the music would cut out in some levels. This emulation error was fixed in 2006 - although not before it appeared in Taito Legends 2.

Puzzle Bobble 2X
Taito later repacked the game with an optional alternative set of levels and some new attract mode animations (including holiday-themed ones), under the titles Puzzle Bobble 2X and Bust-A-Move 2X.

Ports of Bust-A-Move 2 to MS-DOS and Sega Saturn are of Bust-A-Move 2X and additionally include a level editor/designer. A port of 2X was made to the PlayStation but was not released until some time after a port of Bust-A-Move 2 was released, and didn't see an international release.

North American cover art
In North America, print advertisements for the Saturn and PlayStation editions featured a picture of several large blue balls with human faces trapped inside, moaning in apparent agony, with white sticks forcing their eyes open. The shots of the game packaging in the lower right corner of the ad show that the North American release of the game was to use the same cover art as the PAL release. Instead, possibly due to a mix-up by Acclaim's marketing department, the North American release of both Saturn and PlayStation editions uses the main art from the advertisement as their cover art. This cover earned a place on GameSpy's Top Ten Worst Covers list, with journalist Kevin Bowen pointing out that the disturbing imagery was likely to frighten away the game's young target audience. The later MS-DOS and Nintendo 64 releases from Acclaim would use the proper cover art used on the PAL releases.

Reception

Promotion
The game was showcased at JAMMA 95 along with Dangerous Curves and Gekirindan.

Commercial
In Japan, Game Machine listed Puzzle Bobble 2 on their 15 October 1995 issue as being the fourth most-successful arcade game of the month. Game Machine also listed Puzzle Bobble 2X on their 1 February 1996 issue as being the ninth most-successful arcade game of the month.

In the United Kingdom, it was among the nineteen best-selling PlayStation games of 1996, according to HMV.

Critical
A Next Generation critic gave the game a rave review, calling it "One of the most addictive puzzle games in the arcades right now". He praised the challenging gameplay and the "fascinating" trick of bouncing bubbles off the walls to ricochet into the right spot, and concluded, "It's fast, fun, and because of the title's bright, innocent looks and unpretentious simplicity, it's almost unfair."

A brief review of the PlayStation version in Next Generation said it was "sure to please, especially in two-player mode." The four reviewers of Electronic Gaming Monthly applauded the game for its addictive puzzle play, its large amount of content, the usage of tricky bank shots in addition to the color-matching traditional to action puzzlers, and the fierce competitiveness of the two-player mode. Rad Automatic also commented positively on these aspects in Sega Saturn Magazine, and said that though the game is best with two players, the single-player Puzzle Mode makes the game worth buying even for those who have no one to play with. Echoing Next Generation, he remarked that "whilst Bust-a-Move 2 maintains the sweet harmless exterior of a sherbert bonbon, inside beats the addictive heart of a malteser."

Electronic Gaming Monthly named the Saturn and PlayStation versions a runner-up for Puzzle Game of the Year (behind Tetris Attack). It was also a finalist for the Computer Game Developers Conference's 1996 "Best Trivia or Puzzle Game" Spotlight Award, but lost the prize to You Don't Know Jack XL. In 1996, GamesMaster ranked the game 20th on their "Top 100 Games of All Time."

In PC Zone, Charlie Brooker critically called the Windows version a bad conversion with slowdowns, clunky animation, jerky aiming and blurry high resolution. They recommended buying the Game Boy version instead.

References

External links 
Puzzle Bobble 2 at GameFAQs
Puzzle Bobble 2 at Giant Bomb
Puzzle Bobble 2 at Killer List of Videogames
Puzzle Bobble 2 at MobyGames
Puzzle Bobble 2 (YouTube)

1995 video games
ACA Neo Geo games
Acclaim Entertainment games
Arcade video games
Bubble Bobble
Classic Mac OS games
CyberFront games
DOS games
Game Boy games
Hamster Corporation games
Multiplayer and single-player video games
Neo Geo games
Nintendo 64 games
Nintendo Switch games
PlayStation (console) games
PlayStation Network games
PlayStation 4 games
Puzzle video games
SNK games
Sega Saturn games
Taito arcade games
Taito F3 System games
Split-screen multiplayer games
Windows games
Video games developed in Japan
Xbox One games